The Plymouth Pinelands, also known as the Massachusetts Coastal Pine Barrens, is an ecoregion located in Massachusetts in the United States. It is a part of the Atlantic coastal pine barrens.

Ecology
Southeastern Massachusetts, Cape Cod, and the islands of Nantucket and Martha's Vineyard consist of outwash from the last glacial maximum, which left thick glacial deposits of sand and gravel, providing the geologic foundation for a rare pine barren ecosystem. This fire-adapted forest and its coastal components are home to a host of rare species found almost nowhere else in the world. Interspersed among the over 500,000 acres (80 km2) of fragmented pine barrens are dozens of coastal plain ponds, frost pockets, a wide variety of shapes and sizes of its signature tree, the fire-dependent pitch pine, the endangered Plymouth red-bellied turtles and other globally rare plant communities on top of deep deposits of glacially-deposited sands which filter and protect several sole-source aquifers including the Plymouth/Carver Sole Source Aquifer, the largest drinking water aquifer in Massachusetts.

Threats
The pace of development has increased tremendously in this ecoregion. Large-scale development proposals and an increase in the number of new homes are altering the quality of life for residents and rapid residential development has led to the fragmentation of the region's natural areas.

Population increases have had serious secondary impacts as well, including the depletion of the water table by water supply wells and the potential pollution of the aquifer. The development has also led to the suppression of natural wildfire, necessary to maintain the pinelands' rare habitats. Damaging recreation, such as off-road vehicle use on pond shores and in fragile pine barrens, was also on the rise but in recent years the area has also seen an increase in awareness of the importance and fragility of the ecosystem and a corresponding increase in the number of groups working to protect and preserve the natural bounty.

Plants
Sabatia kennedyana, New England boneset, golden hedge hyssops, pitch pine, scrub oak, and other are species are found in this region.

Animals
The federally endangered Plymouth red-bellied turtle is a star attraction in the Massachusetts Coastal Pine Barrens. With fewer than 600 of these federally endangered turtles remaining, the Massachusetts Chapter joined the U.S. Fish and Wildlife Service and the Massachusetts Natural Heritage and Endangered Species Program to assist in nest site creation and nest monitoring, and habitat protection. The pine forests are also home to numerous species of birds and insects.

See also
Two other large, contiguous examples of this ecosystem remain in the northeastern United States, which include:

Long Island Central Pine Barrens
New Jersey Pine Barrens

External links
Southeastern Massachusetts Pine Barrens Alliance

Ecoregions of the United States
Geography of Massachusetts
Natural history of Massachusetts
Plymouth, Massachusetts